Wuchang is a county-level city of Heilongjiang Province, Northeast China, it is under the administration of the prefecture-level city of Harbin, it borders Acheng District to the north, Shangzhi to the northeast, Shuangcheng District to the northwest, and Jilin Province to the south and the west.

The name "Wuchang" has been in use since 1855. At that time people began to reclaim wasteland, and built five noble lodges. It was changed to Wuchang Bureau in 1882, and changed to Wuchang Mansion in 1909. In 1913 Wuchang County was set up. It was changed to Wuchang City in 1993.

Geography
Wuchang is a semi-mountainous town; its ground slopes from southeast to northwest. Wuchang rises over 450 metres above sea level. The mountain Zhangguangcai Ling twists toward the southeast; many hills appear in different layers, such as Laoye Ling and Eagle South Mountain. The Songnen Plain to the northwest provides a flat area with highly fertile soil for agriculture.

The Lalin River and Mangnu River run through Wuchang.

The annual precipitation is 625 mm; the frost-free season is 124 days and the annual sunshine hours are 2,576.
it's not unnormal that the temperature can be around -25 to 30 degrees Celsius in the winter nights, -19,1 must be the middle value

Climate

Administrative divisions 
Wuchang City is divided into 10 towns, 2 ethnic towns,  9 townships and 3 ethnic townships. 
10 towns
 Wuchang, Shanhe, Xiaoshanzi, Anjia, Dujia, Beiyinhe, Chonghe, Shahezi, Xiangyang, Longfengshan
2 ethnic towns
 Lalin Manchu, Niujia Manchu
9 townships
 Xingsheng, Zhiguang, Weiguo, Changbao, Minyi, Bajiazi, Zhangshan, Xinglong, Erhe
3 ethnic townships
 Hongqi Manchu, Minyue Korean, Yingchengzi Manzu

Economic situation
Wuchang has many advantages for agriculture, such as loamy soil, abundant water, and suitable weather. Grain crops dominate the mix such as rice, corn, soybean, sorghum, cereal and wheat. Other crops that contribute to the local economy include beet and tobacco. The short-grain rice produced in the Wuchang area is considered to be some of the best rice in China.

References

External links
Official website of Wuchang Government

 
Cities in Heilongjiang
Districts of Harbin